Qaleh-ye Khorgushi (also Romanized as Qal‘eh-ye Khorgūshī) is a village in Narestan Rural District, Aqda District, Ardakan County, Yazd Province, Iran. At the 2006 census, its population was 91, in 6 families.

References 

Populated places in Ardakan County